Gabrielle Mary Harrison (born 25 March 1964) is a former Australian politician.  She served as a Labor Party Member of the New South Wales Legislative Assembly from 1994 until 2003, representing the electorate of Parramatta. Harrison succeeded her first husband, Andrew Ziolkowski, who died in office.

Private life
Harrison is the daughter of Edwin Harrison and Faye Ware. Harrison's brother, Steve, was a union official and joint secretary of the Australian Workers' Union. Harrison has a sister, Jennifer. The death of her first husband came at a very difficult time for her and her brother, who also suffered the loss of their grandparents in the same week.

Early years
Harrison studied law at Macquarie University, in Sydney.  At university she became heavily involved in student politics, and was chairman of the university Students' Union.  It was at university that she met her future husband Ziolkowski, who was on the Students' Council and editor of the university newspaper, Arena.  She joined the Labor Party in 1984, and was active in Young Labor.  After university, she became secretary of the Parramatta branch of the ALP.  She married Ziolkowski on 30 November 1985.

New South Wales state politics
In July 1993, Ziolkowski advised Leader of the Opposition, Bob Carr, that he had been diagnosed with a very rare form of cancer of the oesophagus.

When her husband died in 1994, Harrison was endorsed by the Labor Party as candidate for a by-election for the seat of Parramatta. She was criticised by her opponent, Liberal candidate, Wendy Jones, for running for office instead of staying at home and looking after her son Tristan, then aged 7. Harrison won the 1994 Parramatta by-election without being forced to preferences, earning a swing of nine percent towards her party. Harrison was re-elected at the 1995, and 1999 elections. With strong interests in netball, running and fishing, Harrison was appointed Minister for Sport and Recreation in 1995. She lost her portfolio following the 1999 State election.

During 2002, Harrison (along with NSW Speaker John Murray) was sued before the Australian Industrial Relations Commission for A$800,000 by former staffer Anne Stonham, who claimed that her contract was "unfair" and she had been overworked. The court subsequently found in favour of Harrison. Another staffer, John Cairn, accused Harrison of keeping photographs of her enemies in a locket around her neck.

In the lead-up to the 2003 State Election, it was reported that,
Right-wing party bosses want to replace former sports minister Gabrielle Harrison in Parramatta with Tanya Gadiel, a member of the staff of Police Minister Michael Costa. ..... Mrs Gadiel [does not] have the support to win local rank-and-file preselection ballots. 
Harrison conceded that she had lost support among her branch members and subsequently announced on 20 December 2002 that she would not be seeking re-endorsement as the Labor candidate in the 2003 State election.

Gadiel was endorsed as Labor candidate for Parramatta in a bitter pre-selection.

Post politics
Harrison lives with her second husband Ron Bonham, her son Tristan, and Bonham's daughter. In late 2002, she told media that she was looking forward to a quiet life.

References

 

Members of the New South Wales Legislative Assembly
1964 births
Living people
Australian Labor Party members of the Parliament of New South Wales
21st-century Australian politicians
Women members of the New South Wales Legislative Assembly
21st-century Australian women politicians